The Caister Murdoch System (CMS) was a major natural gas collection, processing and transportation system in the UK sector of the southern North Sea. It comprised 11 platforms, 8 subsea wellhead completions and interconnecting pipelines centered about 155 km east of Flamborough Head Yorkshire. It operated from 1993 to 2018.

Background 
The Caister Murdoch System (CMS) was originally conceived by Conoco (U.K.) Ltd. and Total Oil Marine plc to develop the Murdock and Caister gas fields. Caister had been discovered by Total in Block 44/23 in January 1968 in Triassic Bunter Sands. However, its remote location near the UK / Netherlands median line meant there was no infrastructure to support the export of gas. The Caister Carboniferous gas field was discovered by Total in Block 44/23 in February 1985 and the Murdoch Carboniferous field by Conoco in Block 44/22 in August 1985. The discovery by Shell Oil of the Schooner Carboniferous gas field in Block 44/26 in December 1986 made the development of CMS viable.

The hub of the CMS was the Murdoch installation which initially comprised just the Murdoch MD platform. The Caister platform, installed in 1993, was an unmanned satellite. Production from MD began in October 1993 and was through the 188 km 26” pipeline to the Theddlethorpe gas terminal (TGT) in Lincolnshire. Conoco's Boulton field (1997) and Shell's Schooner and Ketch platforms were tied into the Murdoch system in 1996 and 1999 respectively. As wellhead pressures declined a compression platform Murdoch MC and an accommodation platform Murdoch MA were bridge linked to Murdoch MD. Other fields were tied in from 2000 to 2012.

List
The locations, properties and late-life (2017) operatorship of gas fields tied into CMS were as follows.

Names 
The names of gas fields in the area are derived from several themes.

 18th and 19th century scientists, engineers and inventors: Matthew Boulton; Henry Cavendish; Thomas Hawksley; Hunter; Lord Kelvin; John McAdam; Munro; William Murdoch; James Watt.
 Sailing vessels: Ketch; Schooner.
 A Norfolk castle: Caister.
Personal names: Katy, Rita.
Gemstone: Topaz (cf. Amethyst gas field).

Developments 
The gas fields were developed through an array of platforms and subsea facilities. These were as shown in the following table, together with data on the peak rate and cumulative production of gas in million cubic metres (mcm).   

In addition to the gas pipelines there was also a methanol distribution system. Methanol/corrosion inhibitor was pumped from TGT through a 4-inch pipeline to Murdoch MD. From here it was distributed to the platforms and wellheads through 3-inch and 2-inch pipelines.  

New pipeline reception facilities and process plant was installed at TGT as part of the CMS development.

Production 

The production profile, in mcm/y, of the Murdoch field was as shown.

Gas compression 
Wellhead gas from the individual fields was routed to either the Suction, the Interstage or the Discharge Manifold on Murdoch MC depending on its pressure.  Gas from the Suction Manifold was routed to the Suction Slug Catcher where liquids were removed. Gas flowed successively to the LP Suction Scrubber, the First Stage Gas Compressor and the Intercooler. Here it was comingled with gas from the Interstage Manifold which had flowed through the Interstage Slug Catcher. The combined flow was routed to the Interstage Scrubber, the Second Stage Gas Compressor and the Export Gas Cooler. Gas was returned to the MD platform and to the Theddlethorpe trunk line. Recovered liquids were injected into the trunk line.

To increase the compression capacity a compressor module was added to the Murdoch MC platform in 2003.

Telecommunications 
Murdoch MD was connected to the Tampnet (formerly NorSea Com-1) submarine telecommunications cable system. It has landing points at Lowestoft, Suffolk, UK and Kårstø, Rogaland, Norway. It is connected to:

1.      Draupner platform, operated by Gassco

2.      Ula oil field, operated by BP

3.      Ekofisk, operated by ConocoPhillips

4.      Valhall oil field, operated by BP

5.      Murdoch gas field, operated by ConocoPhillips (now disconnected)

Decommissioning 
Some CMS fields were shut-in in the 2010s when they became uneconomic to operate. Production from the CMS ceased with the shutdown of the Theddlethorpe gas terminal in August 2018. The platforms and subsea wellhead structures are being removed.

See also 

 Theddlethorpe Gas Terminal
 List of oil and gas fields of the North Sea
 Lincolnshire Offshore Gas Gathering System
Pickerill and Juliet gas fields
Viking gas field

References 

North Sea energy
North Sea
Natural gas fields in the United Kingdom